Cychrus kubani is a species of ground beetle in the subfamily of Carabinae. It was described by Deuve in 1992.

References

kubani
Beetles described in 1992